The 1948 Orange Bowl featured the Kansas Jayhawks and the Georgia Tech Yellow Jackets.

Background
Kansas had completed their second straight Big Six Conference title in their final year under Sauer, and were appearing in their first ever bowl game. The Yellow Jackets had finished 2nd in the Southeastern Conference, appearing in their second straight bowl game under Dodd, and their first Orange Bowl since 1945.

Game summary
The Jayhawks were a team not favored by many, with some favoring the Jackets as a 13 point favorite, and Georgia Tech took the lead first on a James Patton touchdown catch from Jim Stil. Ray Evans would respond with a touchdown run to make it 7-7 at halftime. Still would throw two touchdowns in the third quarter, one each to Billy Queen and Still to make it a 20-7 lead heading into the final quarter. But the Jayhawks would not back down as Evans caught a touchdown pass and narrowed the lead to 20-14, as Kansas was in position to drive for the win. But with :37 seconds left, quarterback Lynne McNutt fumbled on a quarterback sneak and in the ensuing pile, it was determined that Rollo Phillips of Georgia Tech recovered the ball, clinching the victory.

Aftermath
Sauer would leave Kansas after the game, and the Jayhawks would not return to a bowl game until 1961 nor return to the Orange Bowl until 1969. Georgia Tech would go to two more Orange Bowls under Dodd's tenure before his retirement in 1966.

Statistics

References

Orange Bowl
Orange Bowl
Georgia Tech Yellow Jackets football bowl games
Kansas Jayhawks football bowl games
January 1948 sports events in the United States
Orange Bowl